Tom Condos is a skyscraper in Montreal, Quebec, Canada. The tower is located on Union Avenue between René-Lévesque Boulevard and Cathcart Street, near the Altitude Montreal tower and the Place Ville Marie. Part of the building occupies the site of 1972's Blue Bird Café fire.

The architect is Karl Fischer. The project's promoter is Daniel Revah.

Construction started in June 2014, with a completion date sometime in 2018.

References

External links

Official website - Tom Condos
Site Officiel - Tom Condos

Downtown Montreal
Skyscrapers in Montreal
Residential skyscrapers in Canada
Residential condominiums in Canada